Weatherbird may refer to:
Weatherbird cartoon character and strip in the St. Louis Post-Dispatch
"Weather Bird", a composition recorded by Louis Armstrong
Lockheed WC-130 Weatherbird weather reconnaissance plane
Howard McNeil (1920–2010), American meteorologist known as the "Old Weatherbird"
R/V Weatherbird II, a vessel operated by the Florida Institute of Oceanography

See also
Gary Giddins, writer of the "Weather Bird" column in the Village Voice 1974-2003